Tucker is a city located in DeKalb County, Georgia, United States, located near Atlanta and was originally settled in the 1820s, and later developed as a railroad community in 1892. According to the 2016 United States Census Bureau annual estimate of resident population, it has a population of 35,322. In a November 2015 referendum, by a 3:1 margin (73.94%), voters approved incorporating Tucker into a city. In March 2016, Tucker residents elected the city's first mayor and city council.

History

Settlers
The 1821 Georgia Land Lottery opened portions of state land for settlement between the Flint and Ocmulgee rivers, including present-day DeKalb County. The Muscogee (Creek) Nation ceded the land to the United States in January of that year, and drawings for lots measuring  each began in May in Milledgeville, the state capital until 1868. The land grant fee was $19.00.

In 1821, the area that would become Tucker was in Militia District 572 in Henry County. The state created DeKalb County on December 9, 1822, and District 572 became DeKalb's 18th District, or the Brownings District, reportedly named for Andrew Browning.

Among the thirty cemeteries within a  radius of Main Street, approximately 30 graves belong to individuals born in the 18th century, four of whom are Revolutionary War soldiers. Twelve graves belong to Confederate soldiers.

Civil War
In spite of DeKalb County delegates voting against secession from the United States, Georgia joined the Confederacy and seceded from the Union in 1861. The full reality of that decision marched into Tucker in July 1864. Union soldiers camped at Henderson's Mill, used the Brownings Court, one of the few buildings in the area they did not burn, dismantled the railroad to Stone Mountain, and formed the left wing of Sherman's advance to Atlanta.

Railroad

In 1886 the Georgia, Carolina and Northern Railway received a charter to build a new rail line between Monroe, North Carolina, and Atlanta. Prior to the project's completion, the company leased the road to the Seaboard Air Line Railroad system, a collection of regional railroads headquartered in North Carolina eager to extend its reach to Atlanta.

Seaboard built depots at a number of small villages, often little more than a crossroads, and named them for railroad company officials. The depot at Jug Tavern, for example, was named for Seaboard's general manager, John H. Winder. The stop at Bryan was named in honor of the system's general superintendent, Lilburn Meyers. Although the origin of the name is unknown, it is possible that the next stop, in the Brownings District, may have been named for Rufus S. Tucker, a director and major shareholder in several Seaboard system railroads. At the DeKalb County Centennial Celebration in 1922, Charles Murphey Candler stated that Tucker a “prosperous and promising village on the Seaboard Air Line Railway . . . was named in honor of Capt. Tucker, an official of the Seaboard Air Railway.” Some residents attribute the name to a local family with the surname Tucker.

The first train steamed into the new Tucker station on Sunday, April 24, 1892. Originating in Elberton with a final destination of the Atlanta suburb of Inman Park — a four-hour trip — the Seaboard train consisted of two cars carrying 150 passengers and a baggage car. Two months later the US Postal Service appointed Alpheus G. Chewning first Postmaster of the Tucker Post office. Rural Free Delivery began on March 2, 1903.

On Saturday, July 1, 1967, the Seaboard Air Line Railroad merged with the Atlantic Coast Line to form Seaboard Coast Line Railroad. In 1983 The line became Seaboard System and merged with the Chesapeake & Ohio, Baltimore & Ohio and the Western Maryland in 1986 Chessie System to form current railroad operator, CSXT.
Although no longer a train stop for passengers, the Tucker depot is currently a CSX field office for track repair and signal maintenance.

Tucker, at  feet above sea level, is the highest point of elevation on the railroad line between Atlanta and Richmond, Virginia.

Twentieth century 
Following World War II, Tucker began a steady transition from an agricultural community to a mixed industrial, retail, and residential area.  The strength of a county-wide water system extending into Tucker by the 1950s, and the post war establishment of nearby employers in other areas of the county including the Centers for Disease Control and Prevention in 1947, General Motors in Doraville, Kraft Foods in Decatur, and the growth of Emory University, brought new residents to Tucker from across the nation. Descendants of early settlers subdivided and sold family land for neighborhoods and shopping plazas. Local community leaders opened Tucker Federal Savings and Loan, created a youth football league, and by the 1960s newspapers identified Tucker as “DeKalb’s Area of Golden Opportunity.”  The post–World War II baby boom drove the growth of DeKalb County schools and with the affordability of the car, the expansion of the highway system, and inexpensive fuel, Tucker became an ideal location to call home.

Geography

The Eastern Continental Divide cuts through Tucker, along Chamblee-Tucker Road to LaVista Road and continuing south towards Mountain Industrial Boulevard. Water falling to the west of this line flows towards the Chattahoochee River and the Gulf of Mexico. Water falling to the east of this line flows towards the Atlantic Ocean through the Ocmulgee River.

Topography

Tucker is in the state's Piedmont geologic region, composed of igneous and metamorphic rocks resulting from 300 to 600 million year old sediments that were subjected to high temperatures and pressures and re-exposed roughly 250 to 300 million years ago. Rocks typical of the region include schist, amphibolite, gneiss, migmatite, and granite.

Over a dozen creeks originate in Tucker including Burnt Fork Creek, South Fork Peachtree Creek, Camp Creek, and Henderson Mill Creek. Prior to the widespread accessibility of electricity and indoor plumbing, several were used as mill ponds or dammed for baptism. From 1906 until its demise in the 1940s, Burnt Fort Creek was the primary tributary for the Decatur Waterworks.

Surrounding municipalities

Climate

Tucker's climate, typical of a humid subtropical climate, features mild winters and hot summers. In spite of moderate conditions compared to communities in many other states, Tucker has occasional extreme weather.

Transportation

Rapid-transit
MARTA, the Metro Atlanta Rapid Trans Authority, has six daily bus routes traversing Tucker; 75 Tucker, 120 E. Ponce de Leon Ave/Tucker, 124 Pleasantdale Road, 125 Clarkston/Northlake, and 126 Northlake/Chamblee.

Interstate highways
  Interstate 285
  Interstate 85

U.S. highways
  U.S. Route 29
  U.S. Route 78

State routes
  State Route 8
  State Route 236
  State Route 407
  State Route 410

Pedestrians and cycling

 Stone Mountain Trail

Demographics

2020 census

As of the 2020 United States census, there were 37,005 people, 14,479 households, and 8,753 families residing in the city.

2010 census
According to the 2010 census, the Tucker Census-designated place (CDP) had a population of 27,581, and the racial and ethnic composition of the CDP was as follows:
 White : 63.0% (Non-Hispanic Whites: 57.8%)
 Black or African American : 22.3%
 Hispanic or Latino (of any race): 10.6%
 Asian: 7.4%
  American Indian or Alaska Native: 0.4%
 Native Hawaiian and Other Pacific Islander: 0.1%
 Multiracial : 2.7%

As of 2012, the median income per household was $64,388, and the per capita income was $33,552. 11.4% of the population is below the poverty line, 5.6% lower than the state average.

Of the 11,894 housing units identified in 2012, the home ownership rate is 70.7% and the median value of owner occupied housing units, $233,700. Multi-unit structures (apartment complexes, condominiums) represent 22% of all housing.

Culture and contemporary life

Tucker primarily consists of 1960s and 1970s-era ranch and split-level homes, and 1970s and 1980s-era multi-story homes. The latter two often feature daylight basements. Various neighborhoods are typically groups by geographic association with elementary schools and other centers of community life such as parks.

Community organizations
The desire for community involvement continues to foster growth in various Tucker groups and associations. Some of the more significant include; the Tucker Business Association, Tucker-Northlake Community Improvement District, Tucker Civic Association, Tucker Historical Society, Main Street Theatre, Friends of Henderson Park, Friends of Johns Homestead, Friends of Kelley C. Cofer Park, Main Street Tucker Alliance, Friends of the Tucker Nature Preserve, Old Town Tucker Merchants Association, Tucker Parent Council, and Smoke Rise Community Association.

With the exception of sports organizations, involving residents in multiple counties, most of these groups are predominantly led by and serve residents within the Tucker area.

Tucker includes multiple Baptist, Lutheran, Methodist, Pentecostal, and Presbyterian churches; Catholic, Mormon, and over a dozen non-denomination Christian churches, some holding services in Chinese, Korean, Spanish, and Vietnamese. Several churches including Rehoboth Baptist, established in 1854, and First Baptist of Tucker, established in 1893, maintain large youth athletic programs. In the 1970s, The Church of Jesus Christ of Latter-day Saints built a regional welfare and emergency response center in Royal Atlanta Business Park.

Outdoor events
Outdoor events held on Main Street are a central part of the community for numerous residents and organizations. The Tucker Day celebration, first held in the 1950s, is an annual event typically including a parade, that runs the length of Main Street with food vendors, artist, musicians, and merchants. Other annual events on Main Street include the Taste of Tucker and Tucker Chili Cook-Off. The street is also closed for the Tucker Cruise-In held monthly between April and September. The Farmers Market on Main Street has recently moved from its position in Downtown Tucker, to a venue just outside Downtown at a church on LaVista Rd.

The Tucker Civic Association, Friends of Henderson Park, Friends of the Tucker Nature Preserve, Friends of Kelley C. Cofer Park, and neighborhood groups regularly organize park and roadside cleanup efforts. The Tucker Historical Society hosts the annual Brownings Courthouse Day and the annual Garden Tour.

The Tucker High School varsity football team, the Tucker Tigers, is a large seasonal draw for former and current Tucker alumni and residents. Like most high schools in DeKalb County, Tucker does not have a local football stadium, thus home games are technically away games.

Amateur sports
Tucker Football League (TFL) and Triumph Youth Soccer Association (TYSA), formerly the Tucker Youth Soccer Association, are the two largest independent youth sports organizations in the community. TYSA is the largest in DeKalb County, and the fourth largest youth soccer association in Georgia. The TFL holds games and practices at the privately owned Fitzgerald Field. TYSA uses county fields at Henderson Park and the privately owned Granite – Patillo Field.

Adult sports include road bicycle racing. The weekly  Tucker Ride and Baby Tucker. According to Southeastern Cycling, "This is where the big boys and racers show up to play."

Economy

According to data from 2007, the Tucker CDP had 3,709 businesses, and the ethnic composition of the owners was as follows:
 Black or African -owned: 18.3%
 Asian-owned: 10.3%
  Indian and Alaska Native-owned: (Not available)
 Native Hawaiian and Other Pacific Islander-owned: (Fewer than 25 firms)
 White (Non-Hispanic): 71.3%
More demographic figures:
 Hispanics (of any race) were 4.7% of the owners
 Women were 28.8% of the owners

Tucker serves as corporate headquarters for several nationally recognized companies including; Oglethorpe Power, YP Holdings (Publisher of ‘’The Real Yellow Pages’’), Primo Grills and Smokers, and Inland Seafood. Tucker is also home of the U.S. Poultry & Egg Association the Emory University Orthopaedics and Spine Hospital, the Montreal Industrial district, a portion of the Northlake retail area, and Royal Atlanta Business Park. Just Bakery of Atlanta also has a storefront in Tucker.

Community Improvement Districts
In February 2013, DeKalb County Board of Commissioners approved the formation of the Tucker Community Improvement District (CID). In August 2014 the Tucker CID changed its name to Tucker-Northlake CID to reflect expansion into the Northlake business district. Tucker is also home to the Stone Mountain CID along Mountain Industrial Boulevard.

Commercial property owners in both districts vote on a self-imposed millage rate increase and use the funds for community improvements. The tax and millage rate increase applies to commercial property only and not residential. Under Georgia law CID funds may be used for street and road construction and maintenance, parks and recreation area, public transportation, and other services. CID investments are often leveraged through state and local grants increasing return on investment.

Government
Tucker is in Georgia's 4th and 6th Congressional Districts; Georgia State Senate Districts 40 and 41; and Georgia House of Representatives House Districts 81, 86, 87, and 88.
Tucker is in DeKalb County Commission Districts 1 and 4 and Super Commission District 7.

In a November 2015 referendum, 74% of voters approved incorporating Tucker into a city. In March 2016, residents elected Frank Auman the city's first mayor, and Honey VanDeKreke, Matt Robbins, Michelle Penkava, William Rosenfield, Noelle Monferdini, and Anne Lerner its inaugural city council.

Education

In the Tucker CDP, 91.4% of adults have graduated high school, 7% higher than the state average, and 46.8% of adults age 25 or older have a bachelor's degree or higher, 19% higher than the state average.

Primary and secondary education
All public schools in Tucker operate under the jurisdiction DeKalb County School District. The DeKalb County School District's Sam A. Moss Service Center is also located in Tucker.

Elementary schools
 Evansdale Elementary School
 Brockett Elementary School
 Idlewood Elementary School
 Livsey Elementary School
 Midvale Elementary School
 (Gwinnett Portion of Tucker) Nesbit Elementary School 
 Smoke Rise Charter Elementary School

Middle school
 Henderson Middle School
 Stone Mountain Middle School
 Tucker Middle School

High school
 Tucker High School
 (Gwinnett portion of Tucker) Parkview High school
 (Gwinnett portion of Tucker) Meadowcreek High School
 (Gwinnett portion of Tucker) McClure Health Science High School *new 2019

Infrastructure
Tucker owes the origins of its infrastructure in large measure to the efforts of former DeKalb County Commissioner, Scott Candler Sr. In the 1940s and 50s Candler brought resources typically reserved for cities to rural communities. Road improvements, public safety, water, and library resources were pushed to the far ends of the County under his administration. Tucker residents continued the tradition of expansion by maintaining and improving these resources throughout the 1960s, 70s, and 80s. Local businesses like Cofer Brothers, a lumber and supply company, thrived under the mid-century housing boom.

DeKalb County continues to acquire green space in Tucker, invest in road improvement projects, and work with local committees and organizations to improve the area.

Livable Centers Initiative
In 2000, the Tucker Civic Association adopted a Neighborhood Strategic Plan created to assist in identifying goals and policies from the 1996 DeKalb County
Comprehensive Land Use Plan, and to make recommendations for strategic planning and development of the Tucker neighborhood identity.  In 2005, the Atlanta Regional Commission issued Tucker a grant for the development of a Livable Cities Initiative (LCI). The LCI study focused to reestablishing Main Street as a central point for the greater Tucker community, create a more pedestrian-friendly and interconnected town center by encouraging walking and other modes of transportation to and around the commercial core.

In 2008 the DeKalb County Board of Commissioners approved the Tucker Overlay District enabling local business to improve the downtown area.

Police, fire and rescue

In 2006 the DeKalb County Police Department headquarters relocated to Tucker off Northlake Parkway. The Tucker Precinct is located next to the Cofer Crossing Shopping Center.

Tucker is also home to DeKalb County Fire and Rescue Department's Station 5 on Lawrenceville Hwy, and Station 22 on Montreal Road. The portion of Tucker in Gwinnett County is serviced by Gwinnett Police Department, North and South Precincts, and by Gwinnett County Fire Department Station 2 on Harmony Grove Road.

Parks and recreation

 Henderson Park
 Johns' Homestead (Undeveloped)
 Kelley C. Cofer Park
 Montreal Park
 Peters Park
 Smoke Rise Park
 Tucker Nature Preserve
 Tucker Recreational Center (Formerly Tucker Elementary School)

Public libraries
The DeKalb County Public Library operates two branches in Tucker. The Tucker-Reid H. Cofer Library, and the Northlake-Barbara Loar Library.

The Tucker-Reid H. Cofer area branch open on Church Street in 1965. In 2010, the library moved to a 25,000 square foot facility at the intersection of LaVista Road and Lawrenceville Highway. The new facility received LEED Gold Certification from the U.S. Green Building Council.

In 1991, the county built a second library on LaVista Road in Tucker, the Northlake Barbara-Loar community branch, approximately 3.4 miles west of the Tucker-Reid H. Cofer branch. In 2009, the library expanded from 10,000 square feet to 15,000 square feet.

Notable people
Ryan Sieg, NASCAR driver
Shane Sieg, former NASCAR driver
Asher Allen, former NFL player
Patrick Pass, former NFL player
A. J. Bouye, cornerback for the Denver Broncos
Steve Walsh, keyboardist and vocalist for American rock band Kansas, lives in Tucker.
Seantavius Jones, a professional football player
Andy Stanley, founder and preacher Of Northpoint Church and satellite churches
Stephen Hill, former NFL player

References

External links
 City of Tucker
 Tucker Historical Society
 Tucker-Northlake Community Improvement District (CID)
 Stone Mountain Community Improvement District (CID)
 Old Town Tucker Merchants Association
 Main Street Theatre Tucker
 Tucker Business Association
 Tucker Civic Association
 Tucker Cruise-In
 Tucker Day
 Friends of Henderson Park

 
Cities in Georgia (U.S. state)
Cities in DeKalb County, Georgia
Former census-designated places in Georgia (U.S. state)
Cities in the Atlanta metropolitan area
Populated places established in 2015